Calibre is a multi-channel Australian menswear and fashion label launched in 1989 by founder Gary Zecevic. Calibre's aesthetic specializes in tailored suiting, casual wear and menswear accessories with an urban design edge.

History
With 12 years of experience working in retail in Melbourne, Gary Zecevic decided to begin his own label, opening his first Calibre store in 1989 in South Yarra, Melbourne. Three years later, Zecevic opened his second Melbourne store, and soon after, an additional two Sydney stores. By 1997, Calibre began exporting products to the US and Asia, appearing in high-end stores such as Barney's New York, Fred Segal in LA and Lane Crawford in Hong Kong.  Exports ceased in the early 2000s in order to focus on the Australian market. In 2006, The Australian speculated the company was turning over nearly $20 million. The first Calibre concession store opened in David Jones in 2009, and their online store, calibre.com.au was launched in 2011.

Present Day
Calibre now has 16 stores and 8 concessions in David Jones stores nationally, as well as an online store that ships both domestically and internationally. The head office is currently situated in Melbourne, Australia.

Awards 
Calibre won the 2015 Vogue Fashion Laureate award for Best Menswear. Calibre founder Gary Zecevic won the GQ Australian Men of the Year award for Fashion in 2007.

Runway 
Calibre has appeared on many runways since its beginning, notably:
 David Jones AW and SS previews (Calibre was asked to close the David Jones SS09 runway to mark their 20-year anniversary)
 Melbourne Spring Fashion Week
 Mercedes Benz Sydney Fashion Week Australia
 Virgin Australia Melbourne Fashion Festival (previously L'Oréal Melbourne Fashion Festival)

Campaigns 
In 2008, the photographer Terry Richardson shot the Spring/Summer campaign with model Chad White. In 2011, Calibre shot their Spring/Summer campaign in Rio de Janeiro, Brazil, taking inspiration from the colours of the landscape. Acting Up Downtown was the campaign for Calibre's Autumn/Winter 2013 collection, featuring Russian Model Vladimir Ivanov, and shot in New York City. Calibre launched their first collection of underwear with their campaign labelled "The Briefing", which featured a series of videos starring Brazilian model Diego Miguel. This campaign was labelled as "the sexiest underwear ad since Calvin Klein" by the Daily Telegraph.

Customers 
Notable celebrities who have worn Calibre include Hugh Jackman, Jason Dundas, Scott Tweedie and James Tobin.

References

Clothing brands of Australia
Clothing retailers of Australia
Australian brands
Australian fashion
High fashion brands
Retail companies established in 1989
Companies based in Melbourne
Australian tailors